This is an overview of rolling stock manufacturers of Russia, which includes historical and current information.

History
In 1834 the Cherepanov brothers, engineers from the Nizhny Tagil Iron and Steel Plant, built Russia's first steam locomotive. Three years later the Tsarskoye Selo Railway, the country's first public railway, opened. In 1845, the Alexander Factory in Saint Petersburg built its first locomotives. The Kolomna Factory and Kama-Votkinsk began production in 1868. Two years later, the Malcev and Nevsky Plants began production. In 1924 the first Russian mainline diesel locomotives, the E el-2 and Shch-el 1, entered service. Two years later the first electrified suburban section of the Baku-Sabunçu railway was put into service, marking the beginning of commuter-train production. In 1932, the first electrified railway through the Surami Pass opened and the first Soviet mainline electric locomotive was put into service.

During the Great Patriotic War, production of diesel and electric locomotives was suspended; only steam locomotives were produced. After the war, some factories shifted their focus from steam to diesel and electric locomotives. In 1956, at the 20th Party Congress, it was decided to mass-produce electric and diesel locomotives and mothball steam locomotives as a strategic reserve. Two years later, imports of passenger electric locomotives from Czechoslovakia began. In 1959 the first Soviet gas turbine-electric locomotive, the model G1, was introduced.
The Soviet Union's first high-speed train, the ER200, was built in 1974. Commercial operation began in 1984 on the Moscow - Leningrad railway, and was discontinued in 2009. In 2002 Transmashholding, a closed joint-stock company, was formed.

Locomotive and multiple-unit manufacturers

Academic and research institutions 
The All-Russian Research Institute of Railway Transport (VNIIZhT), in Moscow, was founded in 1918. It has branches in Ekaterinburg, Nizhny Novgorod, Belorechensk, and Irkutsk. An experimental ring railroad, VNIIZhT, was commissioned in 1932. Located in Shcherbinka, it includes of research laboratories and three electrified circular lines. The experimental ring is intended to testlocomotives, multiple units, coaches, track elements and other equipment. The All-Union Scientific and Research, Planning and Design Technological Institute on Electric Locomotives Building (VELNII) is a subsidiary of Transmashholding.

See also
 Rail transport in Russia

References

External links
 Union of industries of Railway Equipment website 
 Federal Agency for Railway Transport (Roszheldor) website

Industry in Russia